The Dutch Album Top 100 or Album Top 100 is a weekly hit list of music albums, compiled by Dutch Charts. List shows the 100 best-selling music albums of the moment in the Netherlands. The list has passed through various name changes and has expanded from a Top 10 to a Top 100.

Names

Album chart by Stichting Nederlandse Top 40 
From 1969 to 1999, an alternative weekly album chart was published by offshore radio station Radio Veronica (1969-1974) and the Stichting Nederlandse Top 40 (1974-1999). This chart varied in length from a top 20 (1969-1971 and from 1972 to 1974) to a top 50 (1971-1972 and 1974–1985), a top 75 (1985-1991) and a top 100 (1991-1999).  This album chart was regarded by many as the official one, since it was widely published while the chart listed above was not (not until 1993). The Top 40's album chart was terminated in July, 1999 when it was amalgamated with the Album Top 100 listed above.

See also
Single Top 100

References

External links
 Album Top 100 at the compiler Dutch Charts's official site

Dutch record charts